Daviesia mesophylla is a species of flowering plant in the family Fabaceae and is endemic to the south-west of Western Australia. It is a low-lying, glabrous shrub with sharply-pointed, linear or narrowly egg-shaped phyllodes with the narrower end towards the base, and yellow to orange, red and cream-coloured flowers.

Description

Taxonomy and naming
Daviesia mesophylla was first formally described in 1907 by Alfred James Ewart in Proceedings of the Royal Society of Victoria. The specific epithet (mesophylla) means "middle-leaved", apparently referring to the inner leaf tissue.

Distribution and habitat
This daviesia grows in sand and on rocky slopes in mallee-heath and heath in the Stirling Range and near Denmark in the Esperance Plains and Jarrah Forest biogeographic regions of south-western Western Australia.

Conservation status
Daviesia mesophylla is listed as "Priority Two" by the Western Australian Government Department of Biodiversity, Conservation and Attractions, meaning that it is poorly known and from only one or a few locations.

References

mesophylla
Eudicots of Western Australia
Plants described in 1907
Taxa named by Alfred James Ewart